Sheryl WuDunn (born November 16, 1959) is an American business executive, writer, lecturer, and Pulitzer Prize winner.

A senior banker focusing on growth companies in technology, new media and the emerging markets, WuDunn also works with double bottom line firms, alternative energy issues, and women entrepreneurs. She has also been a private wealth adviser with Goldman Sachs and was previously a journalist and business executive for The New York Times. She is now senior managing director at Mid-Market Securities, a boutique investment banking firm in New York serving small and medium companies.

At the Times, WuDunn ran coverage of global energy, global markets, foreign technology and foreign industry. She oversaw international business topics ranging from China's economic growth to technology in Japan, from oil and gas in Russia to alternative energy in Brazil. She was also anchor of The New York Times Page One, a nightly program of the next day's stories in the Times. She also worked in the Times's Strategic Planning Department and in the Circulation Department, where she ran the effort to build the next generation of readers for the newspaper. She was one of the few people at the Times who went back and forth between the news and business sides of the organization.

She was the first Asian-American reporter hired at the Times and was a foreign correspondent in The New York Times Beijing and Tokyo bureaus. While in Tokyo, WuDunn and husband Nicholas Kristof's news coverage and editorial policies were criticized by some Japanese academics as being prone to exoticism and insulting stereotypes. She speaks Chinese and some Japanese. While in Asia, she also reported from other areas, including North Korea, Australia, Burma and the Philippines. WuDunn, recipient of honorary doctorates from University of Pennsylvania and Middlebury College, was a senior lecturer at Yale University's Jackson Institute for Global Affairs in the fall of 2011. She is a commentator on China and global affairs on television and radio shows, including Bloomberg TV, NPR, The Colbert Report and Charlie Rose, and has lectured at the International Monetary Fund and World Bank and the Council on Foreign Relations.

Biography 
A third generation Chinese American, Sheryl WuDunn grew up in New York City on the Upper West Side of Manhattan. She attended Cornell University, graduating with a B.A. in European History in 1981. For three years, WuDunn worked for Bankers Trust Company as an international loan officer. After this, she earned her M.B.A. from Harvard Business School and M.P.A. from Princeton's Woodrow Wilson School of Public and International Affairs.

WuDunn married reporter Nicholas Kristof in 1988. After working for The Wall Street Journal and other publications, WuDunn joined the staff of The New York Times as a correspondent in the Beijing bureau in 1989.

WuDunn worked for a time for Goldman Sachs as a vice president in its investment management division as a private wealth advisor, before leaving to write a book.

WuDunn and her husband Kristof won the Pulitzer Prize for International Reporting in 1990 for their coverage of the Tiananmen Square protests of 1989. They were the first married couple ever to win a Pulitzer for journalism; WuDunn was the first female Asian-American reporter to win a Pulitzer. She also won a George Polk Award and an Overseas Press Club award, both for reporting in China.

In 2009, WuDunn and Kristof received the Dayton Literary Peace Prize's 2009 Lifetime Achievement Award. In 2011, WuDunn was listed by Newsweek as one of the 150 Women who Shake the World.

In 2012, WuDunn was selected as one of 60 notable members of the League of Extraordinary Women by Fast Company magazine. In 2013, she was included as one of the leading "women who make America" in the PBS documentary "The Makers." She was also featured in a 2013 Harvard Business School film about prominent women who have graduated from the business school. In August 2015, Business Insider named her one of the 31 most prominent graduates of the Harvard Business School.

In 2015 she signed an open letter which the ONE Campaign had been collecting signatures for; the letter was addressed to Angela Merkel and Nkosazana Dlamini-Zuma, urging them to focus on women as they serve as the head of the G7 in Germany and the AU in South Africa respectively, which will start to set the priorities in development funding before a main UN summit in September 2015 that will establish new development goals for the generation.

Books 

WuDunn has co-authored five best-sellers with her husband. China Wakes: The Struggle for the Soul of a Rising Power and Thunder from the East: Portrait of a Rising Asia are non-fiction Asian studies books which examine the cultural, social, and political situation of East Asia largely through interviews and personal experiences.
Her third best-selling book, was Half the Sky: Turning Oppression into Opportunity for Women Worldwide, and WuDunn later was featured in the award-winning PBS documentary made of the book.
Half the Sky was also made into a game on Facebook with more than 1.1 million players.
Her fourth best-seller, A Path Appears: Transforming Lives, Creating Opportunity,  published in 2014, is about how altruism affects us and how we can make a difference.
It was turned into a widely watched PBS documentary, featuring Jennifer Garner, Eva Longoria, Alfre Woodard, Blake Lively, in early 2015. Tightrope: Americans Reaching for Hope, published in 2020, was also a New York Times best seller.

Boards 
WuDunn served for more than a decade on the Cornell University board of trustees, including as a member of the board's finance committee and investment committee. Initially appointed to the Cornell board by the university president, she was later reappointed by the New York governor and served under two governors. She also served for many years on the advisory council of the Woodrow Wilson School of Public and International Affairs at Princeton University and in 2013 was elected by alumni to the Princeton University board of trustees. She currently serves on the board of advisors for Fuel Freedom Foundation. WuDunn is also on the advisory boards of a number of start-up companies in a variety of fields, including healthcare and mobile security.

Bibliography

References

External links 
 Interview with Wudunn for Guernicamag.com
 WuDunn's talk at TED Global in July 2010
 
 Booknotes interview with Kristoff and WuDunn on China Wakes, October 16, 1994.
 Sheryl WuDunn Video produced by Makers: Women Who Make America
 

1959 births
Living people
Cornell University alumni
American writers of Chinese descent
American feminist writers
American columnists
The New York Times writers
The New York Times corporate staff
Pulitzer Prize for International Reporting winners
George Polk Award recipients
Harvard Business School alumni
Princeton School of Public and International Affairs alumni
Goldman Sachs people
American journalists of Chinese descent
American investment bankers
21st-century American women writers
American women columnists
American women non-fiction writers
21st-century American non-fiction writers
American women journalists of Asian descent